In geometry, a monogon, also known as a henagon, is a polygon with one edge and one vertex. It has Schläfli symbol {1}.

In Euclidean geometry
In Euclidean geometry a monogon is a degenerate polygon because its endpoints must coincide, unlike any Euclidean line segment. Most definitions of a polygon in Euclidean geometry do not admit the monogon.

In spherical geometry
In spherical geometry, a monogon can be constructed as a vertex on a great circle (equator). This forms a dihedron, {1,2}, with two hemispherical monogonal faces which share one 360° edge and one vertex. Its dual, a hosohedron, {2,1} has two antipodal vertices at the poles, one 360° lune face, and one edge (meridian) between the two vertices.

See also

 Digon

References

 Herbert Busemann, The geometry of geodesics. New York, Academic Press, 1955
 Coxeter, H.S.M; Regular Polytopes (third edition). Dover Publications Inc. 

Polygons by the number of sides
1 (number)